Saayad 2 is the fourth project of Durgish Films and is a sequel to the 2012 blockbuster film Saayad.

Plot 
The film stars Sushil Shrestha and Sharon Shrestha in lead roles. It also features Amrit Dhungana, Kushal Pandey, Sunil Rawal, Sushil Sitaula, Nisha Karki, Rubina Shrestha, and Buddhi Lal Magar. The film initially cast Sandhya K.C, Arpana Upadhyaya and Aashirman DS Joshi in lead roles but they were replaced by Sharon, Nisha Karki and Kushal Pandey, respectively.

Cast 
Sushil Shrestha
Sharon Shrestha 
Amrit Dhungana 
Kushal Pandey 
Sunil Rawal  
Sushil Sitaula  
Nisha Karki  
Rubina Shrestha  
Buddhi Lal Magar

Tracks

References

Films shot in Kathmandu
Nepalese sequel films
Nepalese coming-of-age films